Martina Zellner-Seidl (born 26 February 1974 in Traunstein) is a former German biathlete. By the end of her career she had won one Olympic gold and six world championship medals, (2 gold, 1 silver and 3 bronze). In the World Cup she achieved 14 podium places with three victories. The best overall placing she achieved was in the 1997/98 season when she finished third.

Achievements 
Winter Olympics
1998 Nagano: Gold medal in the relay
World Championships
1998 Pokljuka: Bronze medal in the pursuit
1999 Kontiolahti: Gold medal in the sprint and in the relay, bronze in the pursuit
2000 Oslo: Silver medal in the relay and bronze in the sprint
World Cup victories
3 (1 sprint, 1 pursuit and 1 mass-start)

External links
Martina Zellner's homepage
 
 

1974 births
Living people
People from Traunstein
Sportspeople from Upper Bavaria
German female biathletes
Olympic biathletes of Germany
Olympic gold medalists for Germany
Biathletes at the 1998 Winter Olympics
Olympic medalists in biathlon
Biathlon World Championships medalists
Medalists at the 1998 Winter Olympics
20th-century German women